The NS 1900 was a series of express train steam locomotives of the Dutch Railways (NS) and its predecessor Hollandsche IJzeren Spoorweg-Maatschappij (HSM).

After the first tank locomotives 771-772 (NS 5700) with superheater, the HSM ordered other locomotives with a superheater. Like the 771–772, these were built by Werkspoor in 1907. The HSM gave them numbers 421–425. In a way, these locomotives can be regarded as a further development of the 350-408 (NS 1600) with a superheater. After good experiences, including a coal saving of 15 to 17%, another order was places for a further 34 locomotives which were between 1908 and 1913.

When the locomotives and rolling stock fleets of the HSM and the Maatschappij tot Exploitatie van Staatsspoorwegen was merged in 1921, the locomotives of this series were given the NS numbers 1901–1940. During the Second World War, a number of locomotives were taken eastward, No's 1908, 1934, 1935 and 1937 never returned and were reported missing. The rest were disposed of between 1946 and 1948. No locomotive has been preserved.

Sources and references 

 R.C. Statius Muller, A.J. Veenendaal jr., H. Waldorp: De Nederlandse stoomlocomotieven. Uitg. De Alk, Alkmaar, 2005. .
 J. van der Meer: De Hollandsche IJzeren Spoorweg-Maatschappij. Uitg. Uquilair, 2009, .
 J.J. Karskens: De Locomotieven van de Hollandsche IJzeren Spoorweg Maatschappij. Uitg. J.H. Gottmer, Haarlem - Antwerpen, 1947.
 M.A. Asselberghs: Nederlands Spoorwegmuseum. Een wandeling langs de verzameling. Uitg. Nederlands Spoorwegmuseum, Utrecht, 1987.

Rolling stock of the Netherlands
Steam locomotives of the Netherlands
4-4-0 locomotives
Werkspoor locomotives
Hollandsche IJzeren Spoorweg-Maatschappij